Marwan Kabha (born 23 February 1991) is an Israeli professional footballer who plays a defensive midfielder for Israeli Premier League club Bnei Sakhnin and the Israel national team.

Early life
Kabha was born in Ein as-Sahla, Israel, to a Muslim-Arab family of Palestinian descent.

Club career
In summer 2015, after playing six seasons with Israeli side Maccabi Petah Tikva, he moved abroad and signed a three-year contract with Slovenian side NK Maribor.

International career
He was also part of the Israeli under-21 squad at the 2013 UEFA European Under-21 Championship.

Honours
Maribor
Slovenian Championship (1): 2016–17
Slovenian Cup (1): 2015–16

References

External links
 

1991 births
Living people
Arab citizens of Israel
Israeli Muslims
Footballers from Haifa District
Arab-Israeli footballers
Israeli footballers
Israeli people of Palestinian descent
Israeli expatriate footballers
Association football midfielders
Maccabi Petah Tikva F.C. players
NK Maribor players
Hapoel Be'er Sheva F.C. players
Bnei Sakhnin F.C. players
Israeli Premier League players
Liga Leumit players
Slovenian PrvaLiga players
Expatriate footballers in Slovenia
Israeli expatriate sportspeople in Slovenia
Israel under-21 international footballers
Israel international footballers